Adams' Rangers, also known as Adams’ Company of Rangers, were a British Loyalist local volunteer corps and independent military company raised to support the British Army during the American Revolutionary War.  Led by Dr. Samuel Adams of Arlington, New Hampshire Grants (now Vermont), the Rangers made their most significant contribution to the British war effort by serving with the ill-fated Burgoyne Expedition in the Saratoga campaign of 1777.

Company formed
The soldiers of Adams's Rangers were recruited primarily from the region of the New Hampshire Grants (also known by the Patriots as the Republic of Vermont), with the largest number of recruits coming from Arlington under heavy opposition from the majority Patriot population and their old enemies, the Patriot Green Mountain Boys. Dr. Adams later stated that he had raised 70 men for the company. Either late in the Burgoyne campaign or in early 1778, the Rangers absorbed a body of soldiers from the Bateaux Service, under Jeptha Hawley, who was also from Arlington.

Campaigns
In 1777, Adams' Rangers were a part of the scouting service during the Saratoga Campaign. Very little has been recorded concerning the activities of the unit during the disastrous campaign, but Loyalist claims made by men of the Ranger company described piloting the army, running dispatches between British commanders, raiding cattle from Rebel farms, and defending Loyalist farms from Patriot foraging parties.

After the British Army's defeat and surrender at Saratoga, Adams' Rangers and other Loyalist units were allowed to retreat to the Province of Quebec. For the next three years Adams' men, like most other Loyalist troops in Canada, were occupied with garrison duty and employed in work parties improving the defences of the Province. Several of the soldiers and their families lived at the refugee camp at the Machiche, near Trois-Rivières, Quebec. In early 1778, the company numbered 37 all-ranks — by mid-1780, their number had been reduced to 27.

Company Officers
Captains
Dr. Samuel Adams of Arlington, New Hampshire Grants
Jeptha Hawley of Arlington, New Hampshire Grants
Lieutenant
Simpson Jenne of Clarendon, Vermont Arlington, New Hampshire Grants
Ensign
Gideon Adams of Arlington, New Hampshire Grants

Uniforms

Company disbanded
Frustrated by lack of prospects and dispersement of his men around the Province, Captain Adams demanded to be allowed to join his company to Robert Rogers' King's Rangers or go to New York to serve in the Central department. When his demands were refused, Adams disbanded his men in late October 1780. Following the dissolution of the Adam's Rangers, a few of the men from the company joined the King's Rangers, but the majority were absorbed into McAlpin's Corps, a collection of under-strength Loyalist units. In November 1781, these British units were consolidated into a new Provincial regiment, the Loyal Rangers, commanded by Major Edward Jessup.

Resettled in British Canada
Following the war, a few of Adam's men returned to the United States. Some settled in Quebec around Sorel, but most were granted land in southeastern Ontario along the St. Lawrence River. The largest concentration of former Adam's Company men settled in Ernestown and Edwardsburg Townships.

References
Coldham, Peter Wilson.   American Loyalist claims Volume 1  Washington DC:  National Genealogical Society, 1980.
Palmer, Gregory.  Biographical sketches of Loyalists in the American Revolution   Westport CT:  Meckler Publishing, 1984.
Muster Roll of Captain Samuel ADAMS’s Company Raised by Order of Genl. BURGOYNE the 9th August 1777 for the Purpose of Rangers. Busherville 23d January 1778..  Great Britain, British Library, Additional Manuscripts, No. 21827, folio 14.
A Return of Men, Women and Children Belonging to Capt. ADAMS Corps of Loyalists at Machiche Augt. 10, 1780..  Great Britain, Public Record Office, War Office, Class 28, Volume 10, folio 95.
A Return of Captain Adam’s Corps of Loyalists. Mashish 6 March 1780..  Great Britain, British Library, Additional Manuscripts, No. 21827, folio 193.
Loyalist Settlements 1783-1789, New Evidence of Canadian Loyalist Claims..  W. Bruce Antliff, The Archives of Ontario, Bicentennial Publication from the Ministry of Citizenship and Culture Susan Fish, Minister.
The Old United Empire Loyalist List, 1784-1884, Centennial, Rose Publishing Company, Toronto, Canada, 1885.
United Empire Loyalists. Evidence in Canadian Claims..  Second Report of the Bureau of Archives for the Province of Ontario. B. Alexander Fraser. Parts 1 and 2. Genealogical Publishing Co. Inc.

External links
 Adams’ Company of Rangers - The On-line Institute for Advanced Loyalist Studies
United Empire Loyalists’ Association of Canada Directory of Loyalists
The Old United Empire Loyalist List

Loyalist military units in the American Revolution
British American Army Rangers
Military units and formations disestablished in 1780